Successor is an EP by Sonata Arctica, released through Spinefarm Records on 7 August 2000.

Track listing

Personnel
Tony Kakko – vocals, additional keyboards
Jani Liimatainen – guitars
Janne Kivilahti – bass guitar
Mikko Härkin – keyboards
Tommy Portimo – drums

Album information
Successor comprises some live versions of Sonata Arctica's songs, an edited version of the song "FullMoon" from the full length album Ecliptica, two new songs and two cover songs from German bands.

The cover songs, which also appear in the Takatalvi EP, are:
"Still Loving You", originally recorded by the Scorpions in their LP Love at First Sting (1984).
"I Want Out", originally recorded by the power metal band Helloween in the 1988 album Keeper of the Seven Keys Pt. II.

The two songs composed for the album are the acoustic ballad "Shy" (originally an upbeat hard rock demo song from when the band were still called Tricky Means) and "San Sebastian", that was re-released on the 2001 album Silence (this song was to be released in Ecliptica, but the band chose to release it on this EP).

Live tracks were performed on 16 June 2000 at Provinssirock Festival, Seinäjoki, Finland.

References

Sonata Arctica albums
2000 debut EPs
Spinefarm Records EPs